= Ordsburg, Virginia =

Unincorporated community in Virginia, United States

Coordinates: 36°57′02″N 77°52′31″W

Ordsburg is an unincorporated community located in Brunswick County, in the U.S. state of Virginia.
